Skopje East Gate (Macedonian: Скопје ист гејт), simply known as East Gate, is a mixed-development project incorporating a shopping and entertainment center, a residential complex and an office park based in Skopje, North Macedonia. It is located about 3 kilometers east from the center of Skopje.

The shopping and entertainment center called East Gate Mall, opened on October 29 and by far is the largest shopping mall in North Macedonia, and the third largest overall in the region of the Balkans.

Overview

This project was announced in 2017 by Balfin Group CEO Samir Mane. On June 1, 2018, in an event in which the prime minister of North Macedonia Zoran Zaev, Samir Mane and other political and business figures took place, it was announced that the project will be finished during the fall in 2021 and would be an investment of 350 million euros, by far the largest foreign investment ever in North Macedonia.

East Gate Living

East Gate Mall
East Gate Mall is a five floor building and it has over 220 international and local shopping brands, a hypermarket, electronics shops and other services. It also has the gastronomy area with multiple choices of cuisines and over 800 seats. The mall also has five Café Avenues, a fitness center, a video playground and 8 Cineplexx Cinemas theatres.

In East Gate Shopping are located world known brands like Zara (retailer), Bershka , Calvin Klein (fashion house), Tommy Hilfiger (company), Adidas, Nike, istyle, Kiko Milano, Massimo Dutti, OYSHO, Stradivarius.  East Gate Mall also debuted 40 new brands in the Macedonian shopping lifestyle like Twinset, Patrizia Pepe, Valentino (fashion house), Burberry, Armani, DSquared2, Mango, Philipp Plein, Michael Kors, etc.

References

https://seenews.com/news/albanias-balfin-unveils-350-mln-euro-real-estate-project-in-macedonia-615038
https://www.filmneweurope.com/news/macedonia-news/item/122020-eight-screen-multiplex-to-open-in-skopje
https://makfax.com.mk/ekonomija/%D0%B4%D0%BE%D0%B1%D1%80%D0%B5%D0%B4%D0%BE%D1%98%D0%B4%D0%BE%D0%B2%D1%82%D0%B5-%D0%B2%D0%BE-east-gate-living-%D1%83%D1%80%D0%B1%D0%B0%D0%BD%D0%BE-%D0%B6%D0%B8%D0%B2%D0%B5%D0%B5%D1%9A%D0%B5-%D0%B2/
https://www.slobodenpecat.mk/video-ist-gejt-mol-se-otvora-na-krajot-na-oktomvri/

Shopping malls in Skopje
Mixed-use developments in North Macedonia
Shopping malls established in 2021